Rajadanga is a small village and also a gram panchayat situated under Malbazar sub-division in Jalpaiguri District, West Bengal, India. This area is mainly known as its agricultural works. It's tea gardens are also increasing rapidly, and there are 4-5 tea factories here.

Education
There is a higher secondary school, Rajadanga P M High School, in this panchayat area.

Nearest Town
Malbazar   (30 km)
Siliguri   (45 km)
Jalpaiguri (50 km)

Villages in Jalpaiguri district